Baldev Dua (1936 – 17 January 2002) was an Indian cricketer. He played one first-class match for Delhi in 1968/69.

See also
 List of Delhi cricketers

References

External links
 

1936 births
2002 deaths
Indian cricketers
Delhi cricketers
Cricketers from Delhi